The Boston Cup is a defunct WTA Tour affiliated women's tennis tournament played in 1998. It was held at the Longwood Cricket Club in Chestnut Hill, Massachusetts in the United States and played on outdoor hard courts.

Results

Singles

Doubles

References
 WTA Results Archive

 
Hard court tennis tournaments
Defunct tennis tournaments in the United States
WTA Tour
1998 in American tennis